Oleg Berdos (born June 9, 1987 in Chișinău) is a Moldovan-Romanian former road bicycle racer, who rode professionally between 2010 and 2014 for the  and  teams.

Major results

2007
 National Road Championships
1st  Road race
2nd Time trial
 2nd Trofeo Città di San Vendemiano
2008
 1st Stage 3 Giro del Friuli-Venezia Giulia
 3rd Road race, National Road Championships
 3rd GP Industria del Cuoio e delle Pelli
 4th Trofeo Città di San Vendemiano
 4th GP Città di Felino
 9th Road race, UEC European Under-23 Road Championships
2009
 National Road Championships
1st  Road race
3rd Time trial
 4th Memorial Mattia Rosa
 6th Trofeo Avis
 6th Giro del Belvedere
 8th GP Città di Felino
2010
 8th Giro del Veneto
2011
 2nd Road race, National Road Championships
 5th Memorial Marco Pantani
2013
 1st  Mountains classification Tour of Szeklerland
 5th Overall Tour of Romania
2014
 1st  Romanian rider classification Sibiu Cycling Tour
 3rd Overall Tour of Szeklerland
1st Points classification
 8th GP Hungary
 9th Central European Tour Szerencs–Ibrány

References

External links 
 

Moldovan male cyclists
1987 births
Living people
Cyclists at the 2012 Summer Olympics
Olympic cyclists of Moldova